Daneault is a surname. Notable people with the surname include:

Hélène Daneault (born 1961), Canadian politician
Richard Daneault (born 1976), Canadian curler